Hammerbach (German) is a river of Bavaria, Germany and of the Czech Republic. It is a left tributary of the Mže near Kočov.

See also
List of rivers of Bavaria
List of rivers of the Czech Republic

References

Rivers of Bavaria
Rivers of the Plzeň Region
Rivers of the Upper Palatine Forest
Rivers of Germany
International rivers of Europe